"Back 2 U" is a song by DJs Steve Aoki and Boehm. It features indie rock band Walk the Moon. It was released on 19 May 2016 via Ultra Records. A remix by William Black was released as a single. A remix EP was also released, featuring remixes from Bad Royale (together with Aoki), Unlike Pluto, Breathe Carolina, DBSTF, Felguk and FTampa.

Background 
Monique Melendez of Billboard described the song as a "dance-meets-subdued pop rock track." Speaking about the song, Aoki said "We each brought our own musical style to the track to make a song that I am so excited for everyone to hear.” Peter Rubinstein of YourEDM described the song as a "soaring progressive-tropical house track that features catchy vocals." The song has been streamed over 28 million times on Spotify.

Music video 
The official music video was released on 10 June 2016 via Ultra Records on YouTube.

Track listing

Charts

Weekly charts

Year-end charts

References 

Steve Aoki songs
Songs written by Steve Aoki
Walk the Moon songs
2016 songs
2016 singles
Electronic songs
Tropical house songs
Electronic dance music songs
Deep house songs
Ultra Music singles
Songs written by Nicholas Furlong (musician)
Songs written by Colin Brittain